Carmine Zoccali  (born January 1947) is an Italian nephrologist and a clinical investigator. He has contributed to research in several fields, most notably hypertension and cardiovascular complications in chronic kidney disease (CKD), CKD progression and clinical epidemiology of kidney diseases at large. He is known for his studies on cardiovascular risk in CKD and dialysis patients. He was among the earliest investigators that focused on the relevance of endothelial dysfunction and inflammation for the high risk of cardiovascular disease in these populations. In this research area, he was the first to link endogenous inhibitors of the nitric oxide system with death and cardiovascular disease. and the first to document a relationship between sympathetic over-activity and these outcomes Dr Zoccali is a practicing specialist in Nephrology, with a national qualification for the full professorship in Nephrology. He is also a specialist in hypertension, certified by the European Society of Hypertension (ESH).

Education 

He received his education in medicine from the Sapienza University of Rome where he graduated in 1971. He then specialized in Nephrology at University of Pisa. His nephrology mentor was professor Quirino Maggiore, the investigator that in the sixties proposed a special low protein diet (the Giovannetti-Maggiore diet) for the control of uremic symptoms and invented cold-dialysis in the early eighties. Dr Zoccali was trained in clinical research in hypertension at the Medical Research Council (MRC) BP Unit in Glasgow (1981-1982) and Epidemiology and Biostatistics at the Erasmus University Rotterdam where he attended several Erasmus Summer School courses in 1989-1993.

Career 

He was a Clinical Research Fellow at the Glasgow BP Unit  (1981-1982) where he worked with dr Jehoiada Brown, Antony Lever, Jan Robertson, Stephen Ball and Peter Simple on several projects on hypertension. Back in Italy, he worked in the main hospital of Reggio Calabria as Renal Unit vice-director with his mentor professor Quirino Maggiore. In 1991 he became Director of the Division of Nephrology at Ospedali Riuniti di Reggio Calabria (Italy) which he directed till April 2014 and, from 1994 to 2002, Director of National Research council (Italy) - Center of Clinical Physiology associated with the same division. Presently dr. Zoccali is associated  investigator and Research Board member  with  the Renal Research Institute   (New York)  and  board member of the MONitoring Dialysis Outcomes (MONDO) initiative and has several international collaborations. 
Dr Zoccali has authored more than 800 publications listed in PubMed  which have been cited >47,000 times. On  June 25, 2021 his h-index is 109 ( 72 from 2011)  At the same date, he is ranked as the top European expert in CKD (the 4th on a world scale)  and Chronic Kidney Failure (the 5th on a world scale) by Expertscape, a ranking system of expert physicians. He is above the 97,5th percentile among investigators evaluated by ResearchGate In an analysis by Ioannidis et al. across twenty-seven scientific fields, from physics and astronomy to clinical medicine, between January 1, 1996 until December 31, 2017 he was among the 4000 most productive scientists during this period. In Italy, he is ranked as the 26th clinical scientist by Via Academy an independent ranking system of academicians in Italy.

Dr Zoccali was chairman of the European Renal Association - European Dialysis and Transplant Association (ERA-EDTA) Registry (2003-2009) and served the same society as President for the triennium 2017-2020 He is Editor Emeritus of Nephrology Dialysis Transplantation,. Past-member of the Scientific Advisory Board of the ERA-EDTA and the ERA-EDTA European Best Practice Committee. He was the founding Editor of NDT- Educational, the on-line educational resource of the same society. He was also President of the Italian Society of Nephrology in 2006-2008.

Dr Zoccali Dr Zoccali is Editor Emeritus of Nephrology, Dialysis and Transplantation. He  is presently an active editorial board member of the Clinical Journal of the American Society of Nephrology, (CJASN) Hypertension,  Journal of Hypertension, American Journal of Kidney Diseases, American Journal of Nephrology, Clinical Kidney Journal, the European Journal of Clinical Investigation (section Editor for Kidney Diseases), Nutrition Metabolism and Cardiovascular Diseases,  Journal of Clinical Medicine, Blood Purification, International Journal of Nephrology and Urology,  Clinical Nephrology, Turkish Journal of Nephrology and the Portuguese Journal of Nephrology and Hypertension. He served as editorial board member also other nephrology journals including Journal of the American Society of Nephrology (JASN), Kidney International, Journal of Nephrology (as Deputy Editor in chief) and Nephron.

Awards 

Dr Zoccali has been the recipient of the 2003 National Kidney Foundation International Award  the 2009 International Dorso Award, the 2018 Richard Yu award of the Hong Kong Society of Nephrology   and the 2019 Gabriele Monasterio award of the Italian Society of Nephrology. He is a distinguished fellow of ERA-EDTA the American Society of Nephrology and the National Kidney Foundation, and an honorary member of the Spanish and Polish societies of Nephrology. In 2018 he was named Doctor Honoris Causa of the University of Oviedo, and in 2019 had the same recognition by the University of Patras (2019).

References

Italian nephrologists
Living people
1947 births
Reggio Calabria
National Research Council (Italy) people